The 3rd Battalion, The Royal Australian Regiment (3 RAR) is a mechanised infantry battalion of the Australian Army, based in Kapyong Lines, Townsville as part of the 3rd Brigade. 3 RAR traces its lineage to 1945 and has seen operational service in Japan, Korea, Malaya, Borneo, South Vietnam, Rifle Company Butterworth, East Timor, the Solomon Islands, Afghanistan and Iraq.

History

Formation
3 RAR was initially formed on 20 October 1945 from volunteers from the 3rd, 6th, 7th and 11th Australian Divisions,  as the 67th Battalion of the 34th Brigade (Australia) on Morotai. The battalion was intended to be part of a wider commitment for occupation duties as part of the British Commonwealth Occupation Force in Japan. 

The 67th Battalion arrived in Japan as part of the Australian 34th Brigade in February 1946. As with the rest of the occupation force, the battalion did not encounter any significant resistance or civil unrest. The 67th Battalion was redesignated the 3rd Battalion of the Australian Regiment upon  its formation in November 1948. The 'Royal' prefix was appended in March 1949. The Australian force in Japan was gradually downsized, with 3 RAR being the only Australian battalion left in the country at the outbreak of the Korean War.

Korea, 1950–1953

3 RAR was rapidly committed as Australia's main land force contribution to the United Nations forces in the Korean War. After a period of intensive training and reinforcement in Japan, the battalion arrived in South Korea in late September 1950. The battalion formed part of the 27th Commonwealth Brigade and took part in the United Nations offensive into North Korea and the subsequent retreat into South Korea following the Chinese offensive in the winter of 1950–51. In October 1950, the battalion distinguished itself at Chongju during the UN northward advance to the Yalu River. Commanded by Lieutenant Colonel Charles Green, it attacked and captured a large North Korean defensive line in a combined arms operation with tanks and artillery. Green was later killed in action. It was one of three units to receive the US Presidential Unit Citation after the Battle of Kapyong, that was fought between 22 and 25 April 1951.

In July 1951, Major Archer Denness briefly commanded 3 RAR between the departure of Lieutenant Colonel Bruce Ferguson and the arrival of the new commanding officer, Lieutenant Colonel Frank Hassett. Over the period 3–8 October 1951, 3 RAR fought the Battle of Maryang San, which is widely regarded as one of the Australian Army's greatest accomplishments of the Korean War. 3 RAR remained in Korea until November 1954, sustaining total casualties of 231 men killed. Upon its return to Australia, 3 RAR was based at Ingleburn and Holsworthy Barracks, in New South Wales.

Malaya, 1957–1959
The next major conflict that 3 RAR was involved in was the Malayan Emergency. The Australian Government first committed a battalion in 1955 to assist the British colonial occupation in crushing a pro-independence uprising led by the Malayan Communist Party, and their armed wing the Malayan National Liberation Army (MNLA). However, it was not until October 1957 that 3 RAR arrived in theatre; it then commenced a period of acclimatisation at the FARELF Training Centre Kota Tingi (later to become the Jungle Warfare School). 3 RAR then moved to company base camps at Kuala Kangsar (BHQ), Lasah, Sungei, Siput, Penang and Lintang. The unit was engaged in military operations against the MNLA in northern Malaya. Operations began in November 1957 and as a result many MNLA camps and food dumps were located and destroyed. 3 RAR was credited with killing 14 MNLA soldiers and was responsible for the capture of 32 others. 3 RAR casualties over the two years were two wounded and four non-battle casualties. Upon return to Australia, 3 RAR established itself at Enoggera Barracks, Brisbane. It remained there for four years during which time it carried out routine training and barracks duties and was organised on the Pentropic establishment, with five rifle companies and an enlarged headquarters.

Malaya and Borneo, 1963–1965
3 RAR also served in Malaysia and Borneo during the Indonesia-Malaysia Confrontation and was involved in a series of highly successful cross-border missions under Operation Claret. During these operations the battalion had four major contacts with Indonesian forces on the Sungei Koemba river, at Kindau and again at Babang between May and July 1965. During these operations the battalion lost three men dead and five wounded. 3 RAR moved into Woodside Barracks, South Australia, officially occupying Kapyong Lines at Woodside, on 14 October 1965.

South Vietnam, 1967–1971

3 RAR served two tours in South Vietnam, the first from December 1967 with the battalion stationed in Phuoc Tuy province as part of the 1st Australian Task Force. The battalion took part in several operations and was involved in mine clearing, counter mortar and rocket tasks and reconnaissance in force operations. Between December 1967 and March 1968 Whisky Company from the Royal New Zealand Infantry Regiment was attached to 3 RAR as an additional rifle company for various phases of battalion operations. As the ready reaction force at the 1ATF base 'A' Company 3 RAR was responsible for clearing and securing the nearby provincial capital of Bà Rịa during the Tet Offensive of February 1968. The battalion was then committed to Operation Coburg in February and March. During 26–28 May 1968, 3 RAR, while stationed at FSB Balmoral in a battalion defensive position, withstood two determined assaults by regimental sized units of the North Vietnamese People's Army of Vietnam (PAVN) during the Battle of Coral–Balmoral. The battalion also played a role in Operation Toan Thang I in April–May 1968. During its first tour of Vietnam the battalion lost 24 killed and 93 wounded.

On 8 May 1970 a group of soldiers from 3 RAR who had served in South Vietnam attacked 1,000 Moratorium marchers who were peacefully protesting against the war in Adelaide. This led to 21 soldiers facing disciplinary charges, including five who had been arrested by police and also faced civil charges. The Army disciplinary heading led to at least 16 of the soldiers being fined or imprisoned for a short period. At least three of the soldiers were convicted when their cases were heard by the Adelaide Magistrate's Court; two did not receive a penalty and the other received a small fine.

On 25 February 1971 the battalion returned to Phuoc Tuy Province. By 1971 American and Australian forces in South Vietnam had reduced significantly and under President Nixon's Vietnamization program U.S and allied forces undertook the process of handing military operations back to the South Vietnamese forces. PAVN forces took this opportunity to try and re enter areas that they had been previously forced out of earlier. This included the Australian and New Zealand Tactical area of responsibility of Phuoc Tuy Province. During the second tour the battalion took part in several actions and saw fierce fighting particularly in Battle of Long Khánh against well-trained PAVN regular forces before returning to Australia by the end of 1971 after an eight-month tour. During these operations 3 RAR lost four killed and 27 wounded.

Parachute role, 1983–2011

A move to Holsworthy Barracks, Sydney, contemplated since returning from operations in South Vietnam, was conducted at the end of 1981. On 1 December 1983, the battalion assumed responsibility for the Australian Army's conventional parachute capability (previously, D Company 6 RAR had maintained an airborne company). In 1985, the battalion was granted permission to wear the dull Cherry beret, common to all parachute units worldwide, and to wear parachute wings identical to those worn by the 1st Australian Parachute Battalion during the Second World War.

From 1989, 3 RAR formed the main combat elements of the Parachute Battalion Group, which also included an engineer troop from 1st Field Squadron, signals detachment from 104th Signal Squadron, artillery fire support from 'A' Field Battery, 8th/12th Regiment and medical support from the 1st Parachute Surgical Team. One of three rifle companies was designated as the Parachute Company Group and maintained at high readiness for three months with another company rotated into the role. The regiment's Reconnaissance Platoon had a medium range pathfinder role trained in free-fall parachuting, including High Altitude Parachute Operations (HAPO), supported by the Special Air Service Regiment in a long range pathfinder role.

The 1st Parachute Surgical Team was raised in January 1989 to provide Level II and limited Level III medical support modelled on a British unit from the Falklands War. In 1995, 105-mm L119 Hamel guns were air dropped for the first time for 'A' Field Battery.

East Timor, 1999–2008
3 RAR played a key role in the Australian-led International Force for East Timor (INTERFET) in 1999. The Battalion arrived in Dili by sea aboard HMAS Jervis Bay and HMAS Tobruk on 21 September and was initially responsible for the city centre, before later securing the western border area in Maliana and Bobonaro. The Battalion later deployed to the enclave of Oecussi where, in early 2000, it encountered the greatest level of pro-Indonesian Militia activity it had seen since the previous year. 3 RAR returned to Australia in February 2000 with some individuals extending their tour in support of 5/7 RAR. It served a second six-month tour of East Timor in 2002 under United Nations Mission of Support to East Timor. In 2020 the battalion was awarded the Theatre Honour East Timor 1999-2003.
 
In May 2006, the 3 RAR Battalion Group was deployed to restore order to East Timor as part of Operation Astute. An online company group was deployed at short notice in February 2007 for four months and replaced by a second company group in June 2007 for seven weeks. 3 RAR deployed again to East Timor in 2008 as the Timor Leste Battle Group (TLBG), undertaking operations to apprehend the rebels that attempted to assassinate President José Ramos-Horta.

Solomon Islands, 2005–2006 and 2021
3 RAR deployed to the Solomon Islands on Monday 24 January 2005 to reinforce the military component of Regional Assistance Mission to Solomon Islands (RAMSI). The 3 RAR company of soldiers consisted of approximately 100 personnel to provide added support to the local and Australian Federal Police in enforcing the rule of law and restoring order in the Solomon Islands. The soldiers tent lines at RAMSI base were named the "Private Jamie Clark Lines" in March 2007 after the accidental death of Clark in March 2005. Renewed violence in March 2006 again saw a company group deploy to the capital Honiara, returning to Australia in May 2006. Civil unrest flared once again in November 2021 where elements of the battalion deployed as part of an ADF response.

Iraq, 2003–2007
In late 2003, 3 RAR was warned to provide a Company Headquarters and a four rifle section platoon for security duties in Iraq on Operation Catalyst. A Company was subsequently deployed to Baghdad from December 2003 to May 2004. It provided specific local protection to the Australian Diplomatic Mission in Baghdad as part of the Security Detachment (SECDET). On 13 April 2004 SECDET elements were involved a very successful contact when an ASLAV engaged a mortar base plate that was firing on the Green Zone. From February 2006 until March 2007 the battalion returned companies to Baghdad as SECDET IX and SECDET X. Both tours were eventful with several contacts, a rocket attack that injured four soldiers, and the accidental death of Private Jacob Kovco in April 2006—Australia's first casualty in Iraq and the subject of intense media attention. The battalion has been awarded the Theatre Honour Iraq 2003-11.

Afghanistan, 2003–2012

2008 saw the battalion deploy a company group to Uruzgan Province, Afghanistan as the Security Task Group (Combat Team Dagger) component of the Reconstruction Task Force 4 (RTF-4) during Operation Slipper. Highlights of the deployment include the establishment of a Patrol Base in the Baluchi Valley, and the short-notice, high-priority deployment beyond the RTF Area of Operations to construct key bridges over the Andar and Moqur Rivers in Zabul and Ghazni Provinces, along the highway connecting Kandahar and Kabul. 3 RAR formed the basis of a battle group that was deployed to the country again in 2012 tasked with mentoring the Afghan National Army 4th Brigade, 205th Corps, before handing over to 7 RAR in November.

Light infantry role, 2011–2018
3 RAR was scheduled to return to Adelaide and based at RAAF Base Edinburgh to be re-rolled as a mechanised infantry battalion under the Hardened and Networked Army plan launched in 2005. It was considered that as 4 RAR (Cdo) had an integral parachute capability there was no requirement for a conventional parachute capability. In 2006, the Enhanced Land Force plan was launched with 3 RAR now to move to Townsville and re-role as a light infantry battalion. From 2006, the Parachute Battalion Group "was scaled back to a task-organised force element" the Airborne Combat Team. On 26 August 2011, the Chief of Army transferred responsibility for maintaining the Army's parachute capability from Forces Command to Special Operations Command. The additional light infantry battalion provided Forces Command with greater flexibility to develop an amphibious infantry battalion. In January 2012, the battalion relocated to Lavarack Barracks, Townsville.

Iraq, 2017

The battalion was warned for Operation Okra in 2017 which saw the unit's command element and Alpha Company deployed as part of the fifth rotation of Task Group Taji. This rotation was based at Camp Taji and facilitated training of the Iraqi Army in the fight against ISIS.

Afghanistan, 2017–2018
In 2017 3 RAR deployed Bravo Company to Kabul Province, Afghanistan as part of Force Protection Element 8. FPE-8 provided security and protected mobility support for ADF elements located in the vicinity of Kabul, Afghanistan including trainers and mentors at the Afghanistan National Army Officer and the Kabul Garrison Command-Advisory Team. Following FPE-8 3RAR deployed Charlie Company on FPE-9 to relieve B-Coy.

Mechanised infantry role, 2018
In 2017, it was announced that 3 RAR would re-role as a mechanised infantry battalion under the workforce alignment of Plan Beersheba to be equipped with M113AS4 Armoured Personnel Carriers. In February 2018, 3 RAR commenced the transition which was to occur over 18 months.

Solomon Islands, 2021
In 2021 3 RAR deployed to help quell escalating violence in the Solomon Islands. The contingent – made up mostly of soldiers from 3RAR – joined Australian Federal Police officers and supported critical infrastructure in the capital Honiara.

Current composition

The battalion currently consists of:
 Battalion Headquarters
 3 Rifle Companies – 'Alpha', 'Bravo' and 'Charlie'
 Support Company
 Administration Company
 Pipes and Drums section

Battle and Theatre Honours
The battalion has received the following battle honours:
 Korean War: Korea 1950–1953; Pakchon; Uijongbu; Chuam-ni; Maehwa-san; Kapyong; Kowang-San; Maryang-San; Sariwon; Yongju; Chongju.
 Vietnam War: Vietnam 1965–1972; Bien-Hoa; Coral-Balmoral.
 East Timor: East Timor 1999-2003
 Iraq: Iraq 2003-11

Commanding officers
The following officers have served as commanding officer of 3RAR. Rank and honours are as at the individual's time in command.

Alliances
3 RAR holds the following alliances:
 United Kingdom – Scots Guards
 United Kingdom – The Queen's Royal Hussars (Queen's Own and Royal Irish)
 Papua New Guinea – 2nd Battalion, Royal Pacific Islands Regiment

Affiliations
 Canada - 2nd Battalion Princess Patricia's Canadian Light Infantry
 3 RAR, Pipes and Drums holds an affiliation with the Mackay and District Pipe Band (Signed 10th Dec 2022)

See also
 Airborne forces of Australia

Notes

References

Further reading

External links

 3rd Battalion "Old Faithful" Royal Australian Regiment Association
 3rd Battalion Roll of Honour

Infantry units and formations of Australia
Airborne units and formations of Australia
Military units and formations of Australia in the Korean War
Military units and formations of Australia in the Vietnam War
Recipients of the Presidential Unit Citation (United States)
Military units and formations established in 1945
Cold War history of Australia
Military units in Queensland